The Tabernas Desert is one of Spain's semi-arid deserts, located within Spain's south-eastern province of Almería.

A nature reserve (protected area), it spans .

Climate

The Tabernas Desert is defined mainly by a cold semi-arid climate and a cold desert climate. Situated between the Sierra de los Filabres to the north and the Sierra de Alhamilla to the south-southeast, it is isolated from the humid winds of the Mediterranean Sea, in an area with little rainfall known as Levante.

The average annual sunshine is about 2900 hours.

This characteristic is also aggravated by the foehn effect.

Above about 800–900 meters the precipitation increases, thus reducing the dry summer season, while the temperature drops. At these elevations, the Tabernas basin climate is not semi-arid any more but Mediterranean.

Geology and biology

The little rainfall that occurs is usually torrential, so that the ground, consisting of marls and sandstone with little vegetation, is unable to retain moisture. Instead, the rain causes erosion, forming the characteristic landscape of badlands. Arroyos formed by torrential rain harbor the scarce vegetation, as well as fauna such as swifts, hedgehogs, jackdaws, pin-tailed sandgrouse, blue rock thrushes, stone curlews, trumpeter finches, and crested larks.

Flora and fauna
The desert is well endowed with vegetation for a desert. Plants such as the sea lavender (Limonium insignis), which are teetering on the verge of extinction, manage to flourish in the semi-arid environment of the desert. In winter, the landscape of the desert turns white when the toadflax linaria (Nigricans lange) flowers. There are specimens of yellow scorpions (Buthus occitanus), tarantulas (Lycosa tarentulla) and black widows (Latrodectus tredecimguttatus) although it's not deadly as the American black widow. Coastal areas have lesser weevers such as Echiichthys vipera and Tachinus dracco, which usually live under the sand.

Reptiles and amphibians
The reptilian population of the desert includes ladder snakes, spiny-footed lizards and ocellated lizards. Marsh frogs, natterjack toads and terrapins inhabit the moist areas of the desert.

Birds
Birds of prey such as the Bonelli's eagles and peregrine falcons roam the desert's skies. Lesser hunters include kestrels and eagle owls. Species such as the blue rock thrush, rock sparrow, rock bunting inhabit the rocky areas of the desert whereas warblers, goldfinches, golden orioles and serins prefer the ramblas near the dry river beds.

Mammals
The desert does not have a great number of mammalian species, with the total number a meager 20. The Algerian hedgehog, besides significant rabbit, hare and dormouse species, is one of the most important mammals inhabiting the area.

Cinema

Because of its similarities to deserts in the southwestern United States, northern Mexico, northern Africa, and Arabia, Tabernas has been a popular area to shoot many films since the 1950s. The Spaghetti Westerns were shot at the three main studios, Texas Hollywood, Mini Hollywood, and Western Leone.

The sixth season of the TV series Game of Thrones was shot in locations from Andalusia to Catalonia, including the desert, which is the Dothraki Sea, a gigantic steppe in Essos, the largest continent.

See also
Climate of Spain
List of films shot in Almería
List of Sites of Community Importance in Andalusia

References

External links

Deserts of Europe
Deserts of Spain
Geography of the Province of Almería
Protected areas of Andalusia
Nature reserves in Spain